Paul Page Douglas Jr (April 23, 1919 – December 26, 2002) was a brigadier general in the United States Air Force. During World War II, he flew the P-47 Thunderbolt in the European Theater of Operations and became one of the most highly decorated flying aces of the war. In 1968, he served as the commander of the 388th Tactical Fighter Wing and flew a full tour of bombing and fighter missions over North Vietnam. He retired from the Air Force on 1970.

Early life
Douglas was born in Paragould, Arkansas on 1919, to Bess Douglas and Paul Page Douglas. He graduated from high school in Paragould on 1938 and on the same year, he enrolled at Arkansas State Teachers College. During his studies at ASTC, he also earned his flying license.

World War II

After the outbreak of World War II in 1939, he joined the Arkansas National Guard and was called to active duty in 1941. He entered the aviation cadet program on April 28, 1941, and received his wings and commission as a second lieutenant at Victoria Field in Texas on December 12, just five days after the Japanese attack on Pearl Harbor.

After serving in numerous fighter units in the United States from December 1941 to June 1943, he was assigned as commander of the 396th Fighter Squadron of the 368th Fighter Group at Farmingdale, New York. On January 1944, the 368th FG was stationed at England.

Flying the P-47 Thunderbolt, Douglas logged a total of 136 missions and 337 combat hours while serving as commander of the 396th Fighter Squadron, vice commander of the 368th Fighter Group and later with the 36th Fighter Group in Belgium, France and Germany. On two occasions, he shot down three enemy aircraft in one flight. He was recommended for the Medal of Honor and twice received the Distinguished Service Cross. In the first ten days of the fall 1944, he led his unit in the interception of German V-1 rockets that were launched toward England. They used P-47’s high-speed dive capability in destroying 494 V-1s. 

Douglas was credited with shooting eight enemy aircraft in the air and destroying 27 enemy planes on the ground, during the war. He flew P-47s bearing the name "The Arkansas Traveller".

United States Air Force career
Following the war, he entered Texas Christian University and received his bachelor of science degree in business administration in June 1948. He then returned to his former wartime organization, the 36th Fighter Wing, at Furstenfeldbruck, West Germany, as commander of the 22d Fighter Squadron until December 1949.

He returned to the United States in January 1950 and he served as jet operations officer at Tactical Air Command Headquarters at Langley Air Force Base in Virginia, an instructor in the first class of the Air-Ground Operations School at Ninth Air Force Headquarters at Pope Air Force Base in North Carolina, where he organized the Forward Air Controllers School and the first jump trained FAC School at Pope. He next went to George Air Force Base in California, and served as commander of the 21st Fighter Bomber Group, an F-86 Sabre unit.

From 1954 to 1958, he served as chief of the Fighter Branch, Flight Safety Research Division, 1002d Inspector General Group at Norton Air Force Base, California. In February 1958, he went to the NATO Defense College in Paris. In August 1958, he went to Keflavik, Iceland, as commander of the 1400th Operations Group, Iceland Defense Force, flying the F-89 Scorpion.

In August 1959, he was assigned to Headquarters U.S. Air Force in Washington, D.C., as assistant for Flight Missile and Nuclear Safety in the Office of the Inspector General. He returned to Norton Air Force Base in 1963 as deputy director of Aerospace Safety.

Douglas went to Cannon Air Force Base in New Mexico, as director of operations for the Tactical Air Command's 832d Air Division in June 1964 and in September assumed command of the 474th Tactical Fighter Wing there. In July 1965, he was assigned as commander of the 41st Air Division in Yokota Air Base in Japan. He was awarded the Order of the Sacred Treasure (3rd Class) from the Government of Japan, for his efforts as the commander of 41st Air Division at Yokota.

During the Vietnam War, Douglas took the command of 388th Tactical Fighter Wing at Korat Royal Thai Air Force Base in Thailand, after the previous commander, Colonel Neil J. Graham died of a heart attack. During his tour in Vietnam,  Douglas flew Republic F-105D Thunderchief 59-1743, which he also named "The Arkansas Traveler".

In February 1969 he was assigned as commander of the 836th Air Division in MacDill Air Force Base in Florida until his retirement from the Air Force on February 1, 1970.

Later life
Douglas married Sarah Lee Chandler on December 23, 1944. They had two daughters and a son.

Following his retirement, he and his wife moved to Conway, Arkansas, where he joined the staff of the University of Central Arkansas. He later worked as the purchasing agent at the university and operated a cattle farm in Faulkner County. In 1983, he acquired ranch property in Bertram, Texas, and built a home and moved his family and cattle rearing there.

Douglas died on December 26, 2002. He was buried at the Central Texas State Veteran's Cemetery in Killeen, Texas.

Awards and decorations
His awards include:

1st Distinguished Service Cross citation

Douglas Jr., Paul P.
Lieutenant Colonel (Air Corps), U.S. Army Air Forces
Date of Action:  October 20, 1944

Citation:
The President of the United States of America, authorized by Act of Congress, July 9, 1918, takes pleasure in presenting the Distinguished Service Cross to Lieutenant Colonel (Air Corps) Paul Page Douglas, Jr., United States Army Air Forces, for extraordinary heroism in connection with military operations against an armed enemy while serving as Pilot of a P-47 Fighter Airplane in the 396th Fighter Squadron, 368th Fighter Group, Ninth Air Force, in aerial combat against enemy forces on 20 October 1944, in the European Theater of Operations. On this date, Lieutenant Colonel Douglas was returning to base as leader of a squadron of fighter aircraft with his supply of gasoline almost exhausted, when a formation of more than 20 enemy aircraft carrying bombs was observed. Completely disregarding the odds against him, he ordered all but five of his aircraft to return to base, and with this small number unhesitatingly attacked the enemy formation with such ferocity that they were forced to jettison their bombs directly over the city of Koblenz and take evasive action. In the ensuing combat, Lieutenant Colonel Douglas relentlessly pursued the enemy, destroyed three of his aircraft and damaged a fourth. His own plane was continually under attack and sustained many hits. He was painfully wounded and his airplane's right wing was set on fire, yet he managed to return to base. The extraordinary heroism and zealous devotion to duty displayed by Lieutenant Colonel Douglas on this occasion are in keeping with the highest traditions of the Armed Forces and reflect great credit upon himself, the 9th Air Force, and the United States Army Air Forces.

2nd Distinguished Service Cross citation

Douglas Jr., Paul P.
Lieutenant Colonel (Air Corps), U.S. Army Air Forces
Date of Action:  March 11, 1945

Citation:

The President of the United States of America, authorized by Act of Congress July 9, 1918, takes pleasure in presenting a Bronze Oak Leaf Cluster in lieu of a Second Award of the Distinguished Service Cross to Lieutenant Colonel (Air Corps) Paul Page Douglas, Jr., United States Army Air Forces, for extraordinary heroism in connection with military operations against an armed enemy while serving as Pilot of a P-47 Fighter Airplane in the 396th Fighter Squadron, 368th Fighter Group, Ninth Air Force, in aerial combat against enemy forces on 14 March 1945. On this date, with only three aircraft supporting him, Colonel Douglas attacked a force of more than fifty enemy aircraft carrying bombs toward the American lines in the Remagen Bridgehead. Completely disregarding the enemy's overwhelming numerical superiority, he attacked relentlessly, compelling the hostile aircraft to jettison their bombs. In the ensuing combat Colonel Douglas destroyed three enemy planes while the aircraft he was leading destroyed seven additional enemy planes with no loss to themselves. The extraordinary heroism and determination of this officer to destroy the enemy are in keeping with the highest traditions of the Armed Forces of the United States.

Aerial victory credits

Source

See also

 368th Fighter Group
 396th Fighter Squadron
 P-47 Thunderbolt

References

1919 births
2002 deaths
People from Paragould, Arkansas
People from Bertram, Texas
American World War II flying aces
Military personnel from Arkansas
Aviators from Arkansas
Recipients of the Distinguished Service Cross (United States)
Recipients of the Distinguished Flying Cross (United States)
Recipients of the Legion of Merit
Recipients of the Silver Star
Recipients of the Air Medal
Recipients of the Distinguished Flying Cross (United Kingdom)
Recipients of the Croix de Guerre 1939–1945 (France)
Recipients of the Order of the Sacred Treasure, 3rd class
United States Army Air Forces pilots of World War II
United States Air Force generals
American people of Scottish descent
American Vietnam War pilots
United States Air Force personnel of the Vietnam War
Texas Christian University alumni
University of Central Arkansas alumni
Burials in Texas